Liolaemus dorbignyi, also known commonly as D'Orbigny's tree iguana, is a species of lizard in the family  Liolaemidae. The species is endemic to South America.

Etymology
The specific name, dorbignyi, is in honor of French naturalist Alcide d'Orbigny.

Geographic range
L. dorbignyi is native to Argentina and Bolivia.

Habitat

Description
Large and heavy-bodies for its genus, L. dorbignyi may attain a snout-to-vent length (SVL) of almost 10 cm (almost 4 in).

Diet
L. dorbignyi is herbivorous.

Reproduction
L. dorbignyi is viviparous.

References

Further reading
Avila LJ, Martinez LE, Morando M (2013). "Checklist of lizards and amphisbaenians of Argentina: an update". Zootaxa 3613 (3): 201–238.
Koslowsky J (1898). "Enumeración sistemática y distribución geográfica de los reptiles argentinos ". Revista del Museo de la Plata 8: 161–200. (Liolaemus dorbignyi, new species, p. 174). (in Spanish).

dorbignyi
Reptiles described in 1898
Reptiles of Argentina
Reptiles of Bolivia
Taxa named by Julio Germán Koslowsky